Lillian, also spelt Lilian, Lilliann, or Lilliane, is a female given name. Its origin is the Latin word Lilium (lily). 

In French, Lilian is the male form of the name, while Liliane is the female form. The first time this name became popular was in the early 1700s, with the expansion of the French colonial empire around the world.

People
Princess Lilian of Belgium (1916–2002), wife of King Leopold III of Belgium
Princess Lilian, Duchess of Halland (1915–2013), wife of Prince Bertil, Duke of Halland of Sweden
Lillian B. Allen (1904-1994), Canadian painter
Lillian Allen (born 1951), Canadian dub poet, musician, and writer
Lillian Alling, walked from New York to the Bering Strait in the 1920s
Lilian Bennett (1922–2013), British businesswoman
Lilian Calmejane (born 1992), French cyclist
Lillian Chrystall (1926–2022), New Zealand architect
Lilian Constantini (1902–1982), born Liliane Chapiro-Volpert, French actress
Lillian Copeland (1904–1964), American Olympic discus champion; set world records in discus, javelin, and shot put
 Lillian Crombie (born 1958), Australian actress and dancer 
Lilian Dikmans (born 1985), Australian model, Muay Thai fighter
Lillian Disney (1899–1997), widow of Walt Disney
Lilian Edirisinghe (1922-1993), Sri Lankan Sinhala actress
Lillian Elidah, Zambian chef
Lilian Fowler (1886–1954), Australian politician
Lilian Garcia (born 1966), American singer and ring announcer
Lillian Gish (1893–1993), American actress
Lillian Greene-Chamberlain (born 1941), American sprinter
Lilian Greenwood (born 1966), British politician
Lilian Greuze (1890–1950), French model
Lilian Helder (born 1973), Dutch politician
Lillian Hellman (1905–1984), American playwright
Lillian Herlein (1895–1971), American actress and singer
Lillian Hoban (1925–1998), American author
Lilian Laslandes (born 1971), French footballer
Lillian Lawrence (1868–1926), American theatre and silent film actress
Lilian Lee (born 1959), Chinese author
Lilian Mercedes Letona (1954–1983), Salvadoran guerrilla and revolutionary
Lilian Leveridge (1879–1953), teacher, writer
Lillian Metge née Grubb (1871–1954), Anglo-Irish suffragette and women's rights campaigner
Lilian Moore (1909–2004), American author of children's books, teacher and poet
Lillian Nakate (born 1978), Ugandan civil engineer and politician 
Lilian Ngoyi (1911-1980), South African anti-apartheid activist
Lillian Offitt (1938–2020), American blues and R&B singer
Lillian Palmer (disambiguation), multiple people
Lilian Prunet (born 1978), French ice hockey player
Lillian Pulitzer Rousseau (1931–2013), American fashion designer
Lillian Randolph (1898–1980), American actress and singer
Lilian Rolfe (1914–1945), Allied secret agent in World War II
Lillian Smith (author) (1897–1966), American author
Lillian Carpenter Streeter (1854-1935), American social reformer, clubwoman, author
Lilian Thuram (born 1972), French footballer
Lilian Uchtenhagen (1928–2016), Swiss economist and politician
Lillian Vickers-Smith (1896–1971), Florida sports editor
Lilian Virgin (born 1939), Swedish politician
Ella Lillian Wall Van Leer (1892–1986), American artist, architect, and women's rights activist
Lillian Wald (1867–1940), founder of American community nursing
Lillian Walker (1887–1975), American actress
Lilian Wells (1911-2001), Australian Congregational and Uniting Church of Australia church leader
Lillian Worth (1884–1952), American actress
Lillian Yarbo (1905–1996), American actress, dancer and singer

Fictional characters
Lillian, a character in the American sitcom television series Charles in Charge
Lillian DeVille, from the nickelodeon TV series Rugrats and All Grown Up!
Lillian Rearden, character in the book Atlas Shrugged
Lillian Kaushtupper, landlady of Kimmy and Titus in the Netflix original series Unbreakable Kimmy Schmidt
Lilly Truscott, from Hannah Montana
Lillian van der Woodsen, mother of Serena van der Woodsen in the Gossip Girl series
Queen Lilian, mother of Fiona in the Shrek series

See also

Lilyan
Lily (name)

References

Baby Name Lilian – Origin and Meaning of Lilian
Origin and Meaning of the Name Lilian

External links
Variant forms of Lilian
What does Lilian mean?

Given names
English feminine given names
Dutch feminine given names
Given names derived from plants or flowers